George McEwen (May 11, 1849 – December 28, 1913) was a Scottish-born farmer, grain merchant and political figure in Ontario, Canada. He represented Huron South in the House of Commons of Canada from 1900 to 1904 as a Liberal.

He was born in Glasgow, the son of Peter McEwen and Isabella Schanter, and was educated in Perth County, Ontario. McEwen also manufactured salt and flax. He was reeve for Hay Township and warden of Huron County.

References 

Members of the House of Commons of Canada from Ontario
Liberal Party of Canada MPs
1849 births
1913 deaths